Frits Schalij (born 14 August 1957) is a retired speed skater from the Netherlands who was active between 1978 and 1987. He competed at the 1984 Winter Olympics in the 1500 m and 5000 m and finished in 10th and 17th place, respectively. He won a bronze and a silver medal at the European allround championships in 1984 and 1985, respectively. Nationally, he finished second allround in 1982 and 1984 and third in 1981, 1983, 1985 and 1986.

Personal records

Source:

Tournament overview

 NC = No classification
 DNQ = Did not qualify for the final event
source:

References

1957 births
Living people
Dutch male speed skaters
Olympic speed skaters of the Netherlands
Speed skaters at the 1984 Winter Olympics
People from Weesp
Sportspeople from North Holland